Sveigen  is a mountain in the municipality of Bykle in Agder county, Norway. The mountain Skyvassnuten lies to the north of Sveigen and the lake Skyvatn lies to the east.

See also
List of mountains of Norway

References

Bykle
Mountains of Agder